Tobias Kamke and Jan-Lennard Struff were the defending champions but only Struff decided to defend his title, partnering Daniel Masur.

Struff successfully defended his title, defeating Robin Haase and Boy Westerhof 6–4, 6–1 in the final.

Seeds

Draw

References
 Main Draw

TEAN International - Men's Doubles